This is a list of television broadcasters which provide coverage of the Bundesliga, the top level competition for association football in Germany, as well as the DFL-Supercup.

German speaking countries

Germany, Switzerland, Liechtenstein and Austria 
From 2021–22 to 2024–25, Bundesliga matches are being broadcast by DAZN and Sky with select Friday games also on Sat.1.

International broadcasters

Americas

Asian Broadcasters

Europe (outside GER, AUT, SUI)

MENA

Oceania

Sub-Saharan Africa

References

Association football on television
Bundesliga
Bundesliga